Prince Platon Alexandrovich Shirinsky-Shikhmatov (1790–1853) was Nicholas I's deputy education minister (1842–50) and education minister (1850–53) who spearheaded the Orthodoxy, Autocracy, and Nationality policy introduced by his predecessor Sergey Uvarov. He was also an amateur poet and translator.

Shirinsky-Shikhmatov came from a Tatar princely family that could trace its lineage to Genghis Khan. He served with distinction in the Russian Navy during the Napoleonic Wars. As a protégé of admiral Alexander Shishkov he followed his mentor from the navy to the ministry of education. Boasting that he was but "a blind tool of his emperor's will", he sought to increase the number of university students who were of noble origin at the expense of commoners. He believed that it was the nobility's duty to rule Russia.

Shirinsky-Shikhmatov's most durable achievement was the Archaeographic Commission set up in 1834 to oversee the publication of medieval archives and chronicles. It continues under a different name to this day.

References 

1790 births
1853 deaths
Borjigin
Education ministers
Members of the Russian Academy
Honorary members of the Saint Petersburg Academy of Sciences
Russian male poets
Russian nobility
Russian people of Tatar descent
19th-century poets
19th-century translators
19th-century male writers from the Russian Empire